João Leite da Silva Neto, known simply as João Leite (Pitangui, October 13, 1955), is a politician in the Legislative Assembly of Minas Gerais and a former Brazilian football goalkeeper who played for Atlético Mineiro in the decades of 1970, 1980 and 1990.

Career

João Leite started and spent most of his career at Clube Atlético Mineiro, for which he holds the record for most appearances and most trophies won. João Leite first played for Atlético in 1977, substituting Ortiz. He also played in the Campeonato Brasileiro, with his team finishing the championship at second place after losing to São Paulo in the finals. In the 17 years that he played for the club, João Leite played a total of 684 matches, won twelve Campeonato Mineiro and one Copa CONMEBOL.

He also played for Vitória de Guimarães, Guarani and América Mineiro, before returning to Atlético Mineiro and ending his career.

He was selected for the Brazil national team during the 1980 Mundialito and the 1979 Copa América, and played 5 official games in total with the Seleção between 1980 and 1981.

João Leite was one of the precursors of the Atletas de Cristo ("Christ's Athletes") movement, and he used to give bibles to the opposing players, becoming known as Goleiro de Deus ("God's Goalkeeper").

Nowadays João Leite is state deputy in Minas Gerais, and has been since 1995.

Honours

Club 
Atlético Mineiro
 Campeonato Mineiro: 1976, 1978, 1979, 1980, 1981, 1982, 1983, 1985, 1986, 1988, 1991
 Copa CONMEBOL: 1992
 Brazilian Champions Cup: 1978

Individual 
 Bola de Prata: 1979

References

Brazilian sportsperson-politicians
Brazilian footballers
Brazilian expatriate footballers
Brazil international footballers
Clube Atlético Mineiro players
América Futebol Clube (MG) players
Guarani FC players
Vitória S.C. players
Primeira Liga players
Expatriate footballers in Portugal
Brazilian expatriate sportspeople in Portugal
Sportspeople from Minas Gerais
1955 births
Living people
Association football goalkeepers
1979 Copa América players
Brazilian evangelicals
Members of the Legislative Assembly of Minas Gerais
Brazilian Social Democracy Party politicians